Major Valentine Fleming  (17 February 1882 – 20 May 1917) was a British Conservative Member of Parliament who was killed in World War I. He was the father of authors Peter Fleming and Ian Fleming, the latter of whom created the James Bond character.

Biography

Early years
Born in Newport-on-Tay, Fife, Fleming was the son of Sarah (née Hindmarsh) and Robert Fleming, a wealthy Scottish banker and founder of the merchant bank Robert Fleming & Co. Fleming was educated at Eton College and Magdalen College, Oxford. He married Evelyn Beatrice Sainte Croix Rose in London on 15 February 1906. Together they had four sons: adventurer and travel writer Peter (father of actress Lucy Fleming), novelist Ian (author of the James Bond novels), Richard (whose son is billionaire Adam Fleming), and Michael.

From 1906 to 1911, the family lived at Braziers Park in Ipsden, Oxfordshire. On his election to parliament, they moved to Pitt House on Hampstead Heath in 1910. He was a Member of Parliament for Henley from 1910 to 1917. In 1916 they built a shooting lodge at Arnisdale, near Glenelg in Inverness-shire in the Scottish Highlands.

Military service
At the outbreak of World War I Valentine was a Captain in 'C' Squadron, Queen's Own Oxfordshire Hussars, a yeomanry regiment, having received his commission on 30 June 1908. After a month of training the regiment was sent to France on 22 September 1914.

He wrote a "brisk and breezy account" to a fellow officer in England in 1914 about the start of the war. Initially the regiment had little more than "a tour of the principal French watering places" followed by a fortnight hanging about Dunkirk and Saint-Omer ("Very dull"), but then on 30 October were told by General de Lisle to:

occupy a line of trenches on the right of Messines. This was disagreeable as projectiles of every variety were exploding with a disquieting regularity all over the ground of our advance. .... Off we went, over some very holding ground, three squadrons in a succession of rushes in extended lines, the regularity of which was still disturbed by the wire! (Never move without nippers on the Sam Browne belt!). Luckliy we had no man hit – I can’t think why – which put some heart into the men .... we began to wonder how to fix the bloody bayonets with which we had been issued two days previously. .... About 4.30 am they were relieved and marched back about two miles to get breakfast, v. hungry and sleepy . (But then De Lisle told them that the line had been broken, so) with empty bellies we become plodding up the usual wire-enclosed ploughed fields on the left of Messines, being pooped at by very high and wild rifle fire .... It was a very trying day for the men, they were d—-d hungry. (The line held, just; but Messines and its Ridge were taken, see Battle of Messines and First Battle of Ypres). 
 
He also wrote to a close friend Winston Churchill in 1914 (the following is an excerpt):

Imagine a broad belt [of land], ten miles or so in width, stretching from the Channel to the German frontier near Basle, which is positively littered with the bodies of men…in which farms, villages, and cottages are shapeless heaps of blackened masonry; in which fields, roads and trees are pitted and torn and twisted by [artillery] shells...

Fleming was promoted to Major on 2 November 1914 and became the commanding officer of 'C' Squadron. He was appointed the second-in-command of the regiment in January 1916.

Fleming was killed by German shellfire at Gillemont Farm, near Épehy, Somme, France on 20 May 1917. For his service, Valentine was posthumously awarded the Distinguished Service Order on 4 June 1917, having been previously twice mentioned in dispatches. His will was proven on 6 November, with his estate amounting to  £265,596 19s. 5d.  (roughly equivalent to £ in ).

Fleming is buried at Templeux-le-Guérard British Cemetery, near the village of Templeux-le-Guérard. Fleming is commemorated on Panel 8 of the Parliamentary War Memorial in Westminster Hall, one of 22 MPs that died during World War I to be named on that memorial. Fleming is one of 19 MPs who fell in the war who are commemorated by heraldic shields in the Commons Chamber. A further act of commemoration came with the unveiling in 1932 of a manuscript-style illuminated book of remembrance for the House of Commons, which includes a short biographical account of the life and death of Fleming.

Fleming's obituary in The Times was written by Churchill.

Legacy
In 1914, shortly before leaving to fight in France, Valentine signed a will that left Pitt House and his effects to his wife Evelyn; most of his estate was left in trust to benefit their four sons and their future families. His wife Evelyn would have a generous income from the trust unless she remarried, in which case she would receive a reduced amount of £3000 per annum. Evelyn never remarried and felt it was a "bad will".

References

External links 
 

1882 births
1917 deaths
British Army personnel of World War I
British military personnel killed in World War I
People educated at Eton College
Alumni of Magdalen College, Oxford
Conservative Party (UK) MPs for English constituencies
Valentine
People from Newport-on-Tay
Scottish politicians
People associated with Highland (council area)
Companions of the Distinguished Service Order
UK MPs 1910
UK MPs 1910–1918
Anglo-Scots
Queen's Own Oxfordshire Hussars officers